Michel Báez Cruz (born January 21, 1996) is a Cuban professional baseball pitcher for the San Diego Padres of Major League Baseball (MLB).

Career
Báez played for the Vegueros de Pinar del Río and the Huracanes de Mayabeque of the Cuban National Series in 2014/2015. He signed with the San Diego Padres as an international free agent in December 2016 for $3 million.

Báez made his professional debut in 2017 with the Arizona League Padres, and after one start where he gave up two runs and struck out seven in five innings, was promoted to the Fort Wayne TinCaps where he finished the season, starting ten games, compiling a 6–2 record and 2.45 ERA with 82 strikeouts in  innings pitched.

Following the 2017 season, Báez was rated as the Midwest League's No. 4 prospect according to Baseball America. He also earned Honorable Mention Starting Pitcher honors on the 2017 Yahoo Sports All-Minor League Team. Baez was ranked as the Padres' No. 7 prospect according to MLB.com prior to the 2018 season. He spent the 2018 season with both the Lake Elsinore Storm and the San Antonio Missions, going 4–10 with a 3.69 ERA in 21 total starts between both teams.

Báez began 2019 with the Amarillo Sod Poodles, going 3–2 with a 2.00 ERA over 27 innings. He was promoted to the major leagues on July 20, 2019. He made his major league debut on July 23, pitching a scoreless inning of relief versus the New York Mets. In 24 games for the Padres, Báez went 1–1 with a 3.03 ERA and 28 strikeouts over  innings.  In 2020, Báez recorded a 7.71 ERA with 7 strikeouts and two walks in 4.2 innings of work across three games (1 start).

On March 31, 2021, it was announced that Báez would require Tommy John surgery and miss the 2021 season. On April 1, he was placed on the 60-day injured list.

On June 6, 2022, Báez was activated off of the injured list and optioned to the Double-A San Antonio Missions. Báez made two scoreless appearances for the Padres in 2022, spending the majority of the year in the minor leagues, where he recorded a 5-3 record and 4.91 ERA in 41 appearances.

Báez was optioned to the Triple-A El Paso Chihuahuas to begin the 2023 season.

References

External links

1996 births
Living people
Amarillo Sod Poodles players
Arizona League Padres players
Defecting Cuban baseball players
Cuban League players
Fort Wayne TinCaps players
Lake Elsinore Storm players
Major League Baseball pitchers
Major League Baseball players from Cuba
Cuban expatriate baseball players in the United States
San Antonio Missions players
San Diego Padres players
Baseball players from Havana
Vegueros de Pinar del Rio players